Winter X Games XXVI was held from 21 to 23 January 2022 in Aspen, Colorado, United States.

Medal table

Medal summary

Snowboard

Ski

Ref

References

External links
 
X Games Aspen official website

XXVI
2022 in winter sports
2022 in American sports
2022 in sports in Colorado
Winter multi-sport events in the United States
Skiing competitions in the United States
ESPN
January 2022 sports events in the United States